The CMLL Universal Amazons Championship (2019) is a professional wrestling tournament produced and scripted by Consejo Mundial de Lucha Libre (CMLL; "World Wrestling Council"). The tournament started on August 2, 2019 and ran for three Super Viernes shows with the final held on August 14, 2019 at Arena México in Mexico City, Mexico.

2019 marked the first year that CMLL held a women's version of their annual Universal Championship tournament, with the intention to make the Universal Amazons Championship an annual event as well. In the finals Dalys la Caribeña defeated La Metálica to win the tournament, as well as a championship match for the CMLL World Women's Championship at the CMLL 86th Anniversary Show. The winner of the tournament was presented with a championship belt instead of a trophy, to match the Universal Championship tournament winners.

Tournament background
In 2009 the Mexican professional wrestling promotion Consejo Mundial de Lucha Libre (CMLL) held their first ever Universal Championship tournament featuring 16 champions from the promotion's male division. The tournament became an annually recurring tournament from that point on.

During the summer of 2019 CMLL announced that they were introducing a "Universal Amazons Championship" tournament as well, with the idea of it being an annual tournament for the women's division. Like the male counterpart, the winner of the Universal Amazons Championship is given a belt as a trophy, identical to the male belt but with a green leather strap instead of a red. At the time of the first tournament, CMLL only promoted two championships for the women's division, so CMLL was unable to hold an "all champions" tournament, instead opting to give the winner a match for the CMLL World Women's Championship at a later date. The winner would also serve as the flag bearer for Team Mexico at the 2019 International Gran Prix.

Tournament participants
Block A
La Amapola
Avispa Dorada
La Guerrera
La Infernal
La Maligna
La Metálica (Mexican National Women's Champion)
Marcela (CMLL World Women's Champion)
Sanely
La Seductora
Tiffany
Block B
La Comandante
Dalys la Caribeña
La Jarochita
Lluvia
La Magnifica
Mystique
Silueta
Skadi
Reyna Isis
Stephanie Vaquer

Tournament
The first block of the Universal Amazons Championship took place on August 2, 2019 as part of CMLL's Friday night Super Viernes show.

Block A torneo cibernetico

The second block of the tournament took place on August 11, 2019.

Block B torneo cibernetico

The finals of the tournament took place on August 16, 2019 and saw Daly defeat La Metálica to win the tournament.

Aftermath
Daly was originally scheduled to face Marcela for the CMLL World Women's Championship at the CMLL 86th Anniversary Show, but due to Marcela suffering an injury in the weeks leading up to the show, that match was cancelled. Instead Daly faced La Metálica in a rematch of the Universal Amazonas tournament finals, this time with the Mexican National Women's Championship instead. La Metálica won the match, albeit in controversial fashion, to retain the championship. Dalys la Caribeña did challenge Marcela for the world title on December 25, 2019, but lost the match.

References

2019 in Mexico
2010s in Mexico City
2019 in professional wrestling
CMLL Universal Championship